Blackbutt may refer to:

Plants 
Blackbutt is a common name for Australian tree or mallee species:

 Eucalyptus
 Blackbutt, Eucalyptus patens. Southwestern Australia
 Blackbutt, Eucalyptus pilularis. Southeastern Australia
 Blackbutt and coastal blackbutt, Eucalyptus todtiana. Southwest 
 Blackbutt candlebark, Eucalyptus rubida subsp. barbigerorum. Southeast 
 Blackbutt mallee, Eucalyptus zopherophloia. Southwest 
 Blackbutt peppermint, Eucalyptus smithii. Southeast 
 Carne's blackbutt, Eucalyptus carnei. Midwest Australia
 Cleland's blackbutt, Eucalyptus clelandii. Midwest
 Dawson River blackbutt, Eucalyptus cambageana. Southeast
 Dundas blackbutt, Eucalyptus dundasii. Midwest
 Fraser Range blackbutt, Eucalyptus fraseri subsp. melanobasis. Fraser Range W.A.
 Goldfields' blackbutt, Eucalyptus lesouefii. Midwest 
 Kondinin blackbutt, Eucalyptus kondininensis. Kondinin, W.A.
 Large-fruited blackbutt, Eucalyptus pyrocarpa. New South Wales
 New England blackbutt, Eucalyptus andrewsii subsp. andrewsii and Eucalyptus andrewsii subsp. campanulata [or synonyms Eucalyptus andrewsii and Eucalyptus campanulata]. N.S.W., Queensland

Places 
 Blackbutt, New South Wales, Australia, a suburb of Wollongong
 Blackbutt, Queensland, Australia, a town in the South Burnett Region